Rhodopetoma diaulax is a species of sea snail, a marine gastropod mollusk in the family Pseudomelatomidae.

Description
The shell contains seven or more whorls, exclusive of the (lost) nucleus. Its color is white covered with a pale olivaceous periostracum. The suture is distinct, not appressed. The axial sculpture consists of rather strong irregular incremental lines. The spiral sculpture consists of a thickened band between the suture and the somewhat constricted anal fasciole. At the shoulder there is a blunt angulation, in front of which are two obscure threads followed by a more distinct thread on which the suture is laid. On the body whorl in front of the angulation there are about 18 threads growing smaller and more close-set anteriorly. There is no siphonal fasciole. The aperture is rather narrow. The anal sulcus is shallow rounded. The outer lip is thin, arcuate, and sharp. The inner lip is erased. The columella is straight, and obliquely attenuated in front. The siphonal canal is rather wide, not recurved.

The height of shell is 19 mm; of the body whorl, 11 mm; the diameter: 7 mm.

Distribution
This marine species occurs off Santa Rosa Island, California.

References

 Abbott R. T. (1974). American Seashells. The marine mollusca of the Atlantic and Pacific coast of North America. II edit. Van Nostrand, New York 663 p. + 24 pl: page(s): 265 
 McLean J.H. (1996). The Prosobranchia. In: Taxonomic Atlas of the Benthic Fauna of the Santa Maria Basin and Western Santa Barbara Channel. The Mollusca Part 2 – The Gastropoda. Santa Barbara Museum of Natural History. volume 9: 1-160

External links
 
 

diaulax
Gastropods described in 1908